Solomun is a Croatian surname of Biblical origin, referring to King Solomon.

Notable people with the name include:

 Mladen Solomun (born 1975), Bosnian-German DJ best known as Solomun
 Ivica Solomun (born 1968), Croatian football player and manager

Croatian surnames